Fortezza Medicea may refer to one of several fortresses built by the House of Medici in Italy:

Fortezza Medicea (Arezzo), 1538
Fortezza di Girifalco in Cortona, 1556
Bastione Fortezza in Grosseto, 1565
Fortezza Medicea di San Martino in San Piero a Sieve, 1569
Fortezza Medicea (Siena), 1561
Castello di Piombino, 1552
Fortezza Medicea di Poggio Imperiale in Poggibonsi, 1488
Fortezza Medicea (Volterra), 1475
which includes the Fortezza Medicea restaurant